The Shoreland Arcade (also known as the Dade Federal Savings) is a historic site in Miami, Florida. It is located at 120 Northeast 1st Street. On January 4, 1989, it was added to the U.S. National Register of Historic Places. The building opened in 1925.

References

External links

Dade County listings at National Register of Historic Places
Florida's Office of Cultural and Historical Programs
Dade County listings
Dade Federal Savings

Buildings and structures in Miami
National Register of Historic Places in Miami
Shopping malls in Miami-Dade County, Florida
Commercial buildings completed in 1925
1925 establishments in Florida